Rod Laver defeated Chuck McKinley in the final, 6–3, 6–1, 6–4 to win the gentlemen's singles tennis title at the 1961 Wimbledon Championships. Neale Fraser was the defending champion, but lost in the fourth round to Bobby Wilson.

Seeds

  Neale Fraser (fourth round)
  Rod Laver (champion)
  Nicola Pietrangeli (third round)
  Roy Emerson (quarterfinals)
  Manuel Santana (second round)
  Luis Ayala (quarterfinals)
  Ramanathan Krishnan (semifinals)
  Chuck McKinley (final)

Draw

Finals

Top half

Section 1

Section 2

Section 3

Section 4

Bottom half

Section 5

Section 6

Section 7

Section 8

References

External links

Men's Singles
Wimbledon Championship by year – Men's singles